On the Streets (French: Dans les rues) is a 1933 French crime drama film directed by Victor Trivas and starring Vladimir Sokoloff, Jean-Pierre Aumont and Madeleine Ozeray. The film was based on novel of J.-H. Rosny aîné. The film's sets were designed by the art director Andrej Andrejew.

The film is also known under the title Song of the Streets, and was the first film of French actor Jean Marais.

Synopsis
The plot focuses on a gang of young criminals and their redemption through the intervention of a sympathetic judge.

Cast 
 Jean-Pierre Aumont as Jacques
 Madeleine Ozeray as Rosalie
 Paulette Dubost as Pauline
 Vladimir Sokoloff as Father Schlamp
 Marcelle Worms as Madam Lérande
 Germaine Michel as Concierge
 Charlotte Dauvia as Jeanne
 Lucien Paris as Maurice
 Humbert as Cigare
 Roger Legris as Moutarde
 Pierre Lugan as Rosengart
 Le Petit Patachou as Moustique
 Emile Rosen as Gobiche
 François Llenas as Main Droite
 Jean Marais 
 Rose-Mai

References

Bibliography
 Crisp, Colin. French Cinema—A Critical Filmography: Volume 1, 1929–1939. Indiana University Press, 2015.

External links 
 
 Dans les rues (1933) at Films de France

1933 films
French crime drama films
French romance films
1930s French-language films
French black-and-white films
Films directed by Victor Trivas
1933 crime drama films
1930s French films